Marzia Rita Gisela Piazza Suprani (born May, 27 1951) won the 1969 Miss Venezuela contest, representing Vargas, after María José Yéllici, of Aragua had resigned three months after her victory. Piazza was the official representative of Venezuela to the Miss World 1969 pageant held in  London, United Kingdom, on November 27, 1969; when she won the title of 4th Runner Up.

References

External links
Miss Venezuela Official Website
Miss World Official Website

1951 births
Living people
People from Caracas
Miss Venezuela winners
Miss World 1969 delegates
Miss International 1970 delegates